B39 or B-39 may refer to:
 Bundesstraße 39, a German road
 B39 nuclear bomb
 XB-39 Superfortress
 Soviet submarine B-39, a Foxtrot class submarine
 HLA-B39, an HLA-B serotype
 B39 (New York City bus)